Ross Murray Geange (born 25 May 1969) is a New Zealand sports shooter. He competed at the 1994 Commonwealth Games, where he was 8th in the fullbore rifle Queen's prize pair and 12th in the Queen's prize individual, and at the 1998 Commonwealth Games, finishing 9th in the fullbore rifle Queen's prize pair and 17th in the Queen's prize individual.

He has won the Ballinger Belt at the New Zealand rifle shooting championships three times—in 1995, 1997 and 2015—and on two other occasions has been the top New Zealander, finishing fourth overall in 2003 and second in 2010.

References

1969 births
Living people
New Zealand male sport shooters
Commonwealth Games competitors for New Zealand
Shooters at the 1994 Commonwealth Games
Shooters at the 1998 Commonwealth Games